Villiers is a small town situated on the banks of the Vaal River next to the N3 highway in the Free State province of South Africa. It was founded in 1882 on the two farms Pearson Valley and Grootdraai owned by Lourens de Villiers.

Location
The town is located in the north-eastern Free State, in the eastern half of South Africa. It actually lies at the border of the province of Mpumalanga, with the Vaal River forming the border. Nearby towns include (and their distance in km):
Warden (98 km)
Heidelberg (60 km)
Frankfort (33 km)
Cornelia (30 km)
Vrede (61 km)
Villiers is also located roughly 150 km from Pretoria (South Africa's de facto capital city), and approximately 70 km from the city of Vereeniging.

History
The town of Villiers is named after Lourens de Villiers on whose farms the town was first built. The town was established at the Vaal River crossing on the very important transport route between Durban and Johannesburg. De Villiers started with the subdivision of his farms into erven in 1882 and the town was proclaimed by State President F.W. Reitz on 29 May 1891. 

In these early days the Vaal River was the important boundary between the then Orange Free State and the then Transvaal Republic. Both Governments erected toll houses on the banks of the Vaal River at the Villiers wagon crossing points, at the site of the current steel bridge. These toll houses remained in force until the creation of the Union of South Africa on 31 May 1910. 

In the early days during typical Highveld thunderstorms and in the rainy season there were sometimes up to 300 wagons waiting to cross the Vaal river at the Villiers crossing. 

The postal service also used this route from Harrismith, Dundas, to Villiers, Malanskraal, Heidelberg and then to the goldfields of the Witwatersrand. The Van der Berg park was used by the postal service to get “fresh” horses for their wagons. This park was also later used as a marketplace. 

Villiers is steeped in history with buildings and structures dating back to the beginning of the 20th century. There are some prime restored examples of Eastern Free-state sandstone architecture and a beautiful church at the centre of town with high pitched slate roof.

Activities
Town activities include:
Eastern Free-state Sandston Architecture;
Village strolls through streets of Villiers;
Villiers Holiday Resort;
Walking routes through town and sites of interest;
Horse riding;
Quad bike route on neighbouring farms;
A school with personal attention and boarding facilities;
Guesthouse, coffee shops and pubs.

References

Populated places in the Mafube Local Municipality
Populated places founded by Afrikaners
Populated places established in 1891
1891 establishments in South Africa